Stadionul Central-Parc is a multi-purpose stadium in Ineu, Romania. It is currently used mostly for football matches and is the home ground of CS Ineu. The stadium holds 3,000 people and was for 85 years the home ground of Tricotaje Ineu.

References

Football venues in Romania
Buildings and structures in Arad County